Hygromiidae is a taxonomic family of small to medium-sized air-breathing land snails, terrestrial pulmonate gastropod mollusks in the superfamily Helicoidea.

Anatomy
Some snails in genera within this family create and use love darts as part of their courtship and mating behavior.

In this family, the number of haploid chromosomes lies between 26 and 30 (according to the values in this table).

Taxonomy 
The family Hygromiidae consists of the following subfamilies (according to the taxonomy of the Gastropoda by Bouchet & Rocroi, 2005):

 subfamily Hygromiinae Tryon, 1866
 tribe Hygromiini Tryon, 1866 - synonym: Cernuellini Schileyko, 1991
 tribe Perforatellini Neiber, Razkin & Hausdorf, 2017
 subfamily Leptaxinae C.R. Boettger, 1909
 tribe Cryptosaccini Neiber, Razkin & Hausdorf, 2017
 tribe Leptaxini C.R. Boettger, 1909
 tribe Perforatellini Neiber, Razkin & Hausdorf, 2017
 subfamily Metafruticicolinae Schileyko, 1972
 subfamily Ponentininae Schileyko, 1991
 subfamily Trochulininae Lindholm, 1927
 tribe Archaicini Schileyko, 1978
 tribe Caucasigenini Neiber, Razkin & Hausdorf, 2017
 tribe Ciliellini Schileyko, 1970
 tribe Halolimnohelicini H. Nordsieck, 1986
 tribe Monachaini Wenz, 1930 (1904)
 tribe Trochulini Lindholm, 1927
 tribe Urticicolini Neiber, Razkin & Hausdorf, 2017

Genera 
Genera with the family Hygromiidae include:

The type genus of this family is Hygromia Risso, 1826.
Not belonging to a subfamily
 † Archygromia Pfeffer, 1930 
 † Camaenopsis Dollfus & Dautzenberg, 1924 
 Cernuellopsis Manganelli & Giusti, 1988
 Helicotricha Giusti, Manganelli & Crisci, 1992
 † Hemistenotrema O. Boettger, 1897 
 † Hochheimia Harzhauser & Neubauer, 2021
 Ichnusomunda Giusti & Manganelli, 1998
 Kalitinaia Hudec & Lezhawa, 1967
 † Leucochroopsis O. Boettger, 1908 
 † Loganiopharynx Wenz, 1919 
 † Pseudomonacha Pfeffer, 1930 
 † Pseudoxerotricha C. R. Boettger, 1911

subfamily Hygromiinae Tryon, 1866
 tribe Hygromiini Tryon, 1866
 Hygromia Risso, 1826
 Zenobiellina Holyoak, D. T. & Holyoak, G. A., 2018

 tribe Perforatellini Neiber, Razkin & Hausdorf, 2017
 Chilanodon Westerlund, 1897
 Kovacsia H. Nordsieck, 1993
 Lindholmomneme F. Haas, 1936
 Lozekia Hudec, 1970
 Monachoides Gude & B. B. Woodward, 1921
 Noneulota Schileyko & Horsák, 2007
 Perforatella Schlüter, 1838
 Pseudotrichia Schileyko, 1970
 Stygius Schileyko, 1970

 tribe incerta

subfamily Leptaxinae C.R. Boettger, 1909
 Tribe Cryptosaccini Neiber, Razkin & Hausdorf, 2017
 Cryptosaccus Prieto & Puente, 1994
 Fractanella Caro & Madeira, 2019
 Mengoana Ortiz de Zárate López, 1951
 Pyrenaearia P. Hesse, 1921

 Tribe Leptaxini C.R. Boettger, 1909
 Leptaxis R. T. Lowe, 1852
 Portugala E. Gittenberger, 1980

subfamily Metafruticicolinae Schileyko, 1972
 Cyrnotheba Germain, 1928
 Elbasania Schileyko & Fehér, 2017
 Hiltrudia H. Nordsieck, 1993
 Metafruticicola Ihering, 1892

 subfamily Trochulininae Lindholm, 1927
 Tribe Archaicini Schileyko, 1978
 Angiomphalia Schileyko, 1978
 Archaica Schileyko, 1970
 Coronarchaica Neiber, Razkin & Hausdorf, 2017
 Leucozonella Lindholm, 1927
 Odontotrema Lindholm, 1927
  Paedhoplita Lindholm, 1927

 Tribe Ashfordiini Neiber, Razkin & Hausdorf, 2017
 Ashfordia J. W. Taylor, 1917

 tribe Caucasigenini Neiber, Razkin & Hausdorf, 2017
 Anoplitella Lindholm, 1929
 Caucasigena Lindholm, 1927
 Circassina P. Hesse, 1921
 Diodontella Lindholm, 1929
 Dioscuria Lindholm, 1927
 Fruticocampylaea Kobelt, 1871
 Hygrohelicopsis Schileyko, 1978
 Lazicana Neiber, Walther & Hausdorf, 2018
 Teberdinia Schileyko, 1978

 Tribe Ciliellini Schileyko, 1970
 Ciliella Mousson, 1872
 Ciliellopsis Giusti & Manganelli, 1990

 tribe Ganulini Neiber, Razkin & Hausdorf, 2017
 Ganula E. Gittenberger, 1970
 Ichnusotricha Giusti & Manganelli, 1987
 Nienhuisiella Giusti & Manganelli, 1987

 tribe Halolimnohelicini H. Nordsieck, 1986
 Elgonella Preston, 1914
 Halolimnohelix Germain, 1913
 Haplohelix Pilsbry, 1919
 Vicariihelix Pilsbry, 1919

 tribe Monachaini Wenz, 1930 (1904)
 Abchasohela Hudec & Lezhawa, 1971
 Batumica Schileyko, 1978
 Caucasocressa P. Hesse, 1921
 Diplobursa Schileyko, 1968
 Euomphalia Westerlund, 1889
 Harmozica Lindholm, 1927
 Hesseola Lindholm, 1927
 Jasonella Lindholm, 1927
 Karabaghia Lindholm, 1927
 Lejeania Ancey, 1887
 Monacha Fitzinger, 1833 - type genus of the subfamily Monachainae
 Oscarboettgeria Lindholm, 1927
 Platytheba Pilsbry, 1895: synonym of Monacha Fitzinger, 1833 (junior synonym)
  Prostenomphalia Baidashnikov, 1985
 Pseudhesseola H. Nordsieck, 1993
 Stenomphalia Lindholm, 1927

 tribe Trochulini Lindholm, 1927
 Edentiella Poliński, 1929
 Noricella Neiber, Razkin & Hausdorf, 2017
 Petasina H. Beck, 1847
 Raeticella Kneubühler, Baggenstos & Neubert, 2022
 Trochulus Chemnitz, 1786 - synonym: Trichia

 Tribe Urticicolini Neiber, Razkin & Hausdorf, 2017
 Plicuteria Schileyko, 1978
 Semifruticicola A. J. Wagner, 1914
 Urticicola Lindholm, 1927
 Xerocampylaea Kobelt, 1871

Synonyms
 Kokotschashvilia Hudec & Lezhawa, 1969: synonym of Dioscuria Lindholm, 1927
 Shileykoia Hudec, 1969: synonym of Fruticocampylaea Kobelt, 1871
 Tyrrheniella: synonym of Tyrrheniellina Giusti & Manganelli, 1992
 Zenobiella Gude & Woodward, 1921 - with the only species Zenobiella subrufescens (Miller, 1822): synonym of Zenobiellina Holyoak, D. T. & Holyoak, G. A., 2018 (junior synonym)

References

External links
 A page of images of shells of species in the family
  Razkin, O., Gómez-Moliner, B. J., Prieto, C. E., Martínez-Ortí, A., Arrébola, J. R., Muñoz, B., Chueca, L. J. & Madeira, M. J. (2015). Molecular phylogeny of the western Palaearctic Helicoidea (Gastropoda, Stylommatophora). Molecular Phylogenetics and Evolution. 83: 99-117
 Neiber, M. T., Razkin, O. & Hausdorf, B. (2017). Molecular phylogeny and biogeography of the land snail family Hygromiidae (Gastropoda: Helicoidea). Molecular Phylogenetics and Evolution. 111: 169-184.

 
Taxa named by George Washington Tryon